= ABC Network =

ABC Network may refer to:

- American Broadcasting Company, a commercial television network in the US
- Australian Broadcasting Corporation, Australia's public broadcaster
- ABC Weekend TV, a former ITV company in the UK
- Asahi Broadcasting Corporation, regional radio and television broadcaster in Japan
- Associated Broadcasting Company:
  - A former name of TV5 Network, a radio and television network in the Philippines
  - A former name of Associated Television (ATV), a former ITV company in the UK
